Peperomia vellarimalica is a species of plant from the genus 'Peperomia'. It grows in wet tropical biomes. It was discovered by Jose Mathew and Pichan Salim in 2018. They named it after a nearby Mountain Range in Kerala, India.

Etymology
vellarimalica came from the locality "Vellarimala". This refers to Vellarimala being found in Kerala, India.

Distribution
Peperomia vellarimalica is native to India.

India
Kerala

References

vellarimalica
Flora of Asia
Flora of India
Plants described in 2018